Milangela Rosales (born 21 February 1987, in Mérida) is a Venezuelan race walker. She competed in the 20 km kilometres event at the 2012 Summer Olympics.

Personal bests
10,000 metres walk: 46:40.22 min –  San Fernando, 4 June 2010
20,000 metres walk: 1:32:17.6 hrs –  Buenos Aires, 5 June 2011

International competitions

References

External links

1987 births
Living people
People from Mérida, Mérida
Venezuelan female racewalkers
Olympic athletes of Venezuela
Athletes (track and field) at the 2012 Summer Olympics
Pan American Games competitors for Venezuela
Athletes (track and field) at the 2011 Pan American Games
World Athletics Championships athletes for Venezuela
Central American and Caribbean Games medalists in athletics